Jason Lee Steorts (pronounced 'storts') is an American journalist, writer and editor. Steorts is the managing editor of National Review.

Controversy
Steorts has been controversial among NR readers for his support of same-sex marriage (most notably in a National Review story released on May 19, 2015).  Most of his occasional written contributions on National Review Online are critical of aspects of the conservative movement.

References

Living people
American male journalists
American editors
21st-century American non-fiction writers
National Review people
American columnists
American political commentators
American political writers
American social commentators
Year of birth missing (living people)
21st-century American male writers
Harvard College alumni